Enilospirone (CERM-3,726) is a selective 5-HT1A receptor agonist of the azapirone class.

See also 
 Azapirone

References

Further reading 
 

Chloroarenes
Phenol ethers
Lactams
Azapirones